Mohammed "Mo" Yasin is a Pakistani squash coach and retired squash player from Pakistan. One of the leading players in the game in the 1970s, Yasin was a finalist in the 1974 British Open.Yasin is very famous for beating World champion Jonah Barington and preventing him for equalling Hashim Khan's record of 7 British Open Titles at that time in 1974. He did not play the final due to his ankle injury while playing with Qamar Zaman in the semi-final.

References

External links
 
 

Pakistani male squash players
Living people
Year of birth missing (living people)